The Fishing Bridge Museum is one of a series of "trailside museums" in Yellowstone National Park, Wyoming, United States, designed by architect Herbert Maier in a style that has become known as National Park Service Rustic.  It is one of three parts of a 1987-declared National Historic Landmark, the Norris, Madison, and Fishing Bridge Museums. It was not listed separately on the National Register of Historic Places as the other two were. Built in 1931, the Fishing Bridge Museum is the largest in the series, and is used as a small visitor center. The museum displays stuffed mounts of birds and animals found in Yellowstone Park.

See also
Madison Museum
Norris Museum
Old Faithful Museum of Thermal Activity

References

External links 
Wyoming SHPO listing 
Fishing Bridge Museum & Visitor Center
Historic American Buildings Survey (HABS) documentation, filed under Lake, Teton County, WY:

Government buildings completed in 1931
Buildings and structures in Yellowstone National Park in Wyoming
Natural history museums in Wyoming
National Park Service visitor centers
Local museums in the United States
National Park Service rustic in Wyoming
Museums in Park County, Wyoming
Historic American Buildings Survey in Wyoming
Historic district contributing properties in Wyoming
Park buildings and structures on the National Register of Historic Places in Wyoming
Museums on the National Register of Historic Places
National Register of Historic Places in Yellowstone National Park
1931 establishments in Wyoming
Museums established in 1931